Adam Mohuczy (1891–1953) was a Polish Navy officer. Captain of several ships and squadrons, Counter Admiral from 1946 and Chief of Staff and Commander of the Polish Navy from 1945–1947. In 1949 arrested by Polish secret police, accused of sabotage, tortured. He died in prison in 1953. In 1957 he was rehabilitated.

Biography
Adam was born on 7 March 1891 in Vitebsk, Russian Empire. He enlisted in the Russian Navy to become a military officer, finishing the Naval Corps School in Saint Petersburg in 1911.

From 1912 to 1916 he served aboard a training ship, armored cruiser General-Admiral class Gerzog Edinburgski, next, armoured cruiser, Rossiya, battleship Tsarievitch, and submarines Akula, Bars and S-12. Later he was an instructor in Mykolaiv Naval Academy. In 1917 he took a course of underwater swimming.

In the aftermath of the First World War, Poland regained independence. Adam Mohuczy joined the Polish Navy; first he served in the organizational structures in Warsaw and Toruń.

He studied and graduated from École de Guerre Navale in Paris in 1926.

External links 
Adam Mohuczy on dzieje.pl

Further reading
 Drzewiecki Andrzej, Adam, Aleksander i Borys Mohuczowie w służbie Polskiej Marynarki Wojennej, Wydawnictwo Marszałek, Toruń 2005, .
 Babnis Maria, Czerwińska Małgorzata, Czerwiński Julian, Jankowski Alfons, Sawicki Jan, Kadry Morskie Rzeczypospolitej, tome II, Polska Marynarka Wojenna, part I, Korpus oficerów 1918-1947, Wyższa Szkoła Morska, Gdynia 1996, .

1891 births
1953 deaths
Polish Navy admirals
Polish People's Republic rehabilitations
Polish torture victims
Polish people who died in prison custody
Prisoners who died in Polish People's Republic detention
Prisoners of Oflag II-C